Nezamysl is a male given name. It is Slavic in origin. The name Nezamysl is thought to be derived from the opposite meaning to Přemysl - "not thinking", cf. Roman "Simplicius". Záviš Kalandra thought the names of the seven princes were cryptic names of ancient Slavonic days of the week - Nezamysl being the first - Sunday when we do not think/intend to work.[2] Another theory says that the names were mistaken from a coherent and partly interrupted old Slavonic text.

Name Days 
Czech: 8 August

Nicknames 
Nez, Nezam, Nezzy, Nezek, Zámyš

Famous bearers 
Nezamysl, a mythical prince of Bohemia.
Nezamysl, a fictional character from The Pagan Queen film. He played by Filip Hess.

External links 
Behind the Name

Slavic masculine given names
Czech masculine given names